The Best Awful There Is (retitled The Best Awful as a paperback), is a 2004 novel by actress and author Carrie Fisher. It is a sequel to her debut novel Postcards from the Edge.

Like most of Fisher's books, this novel is semi-autobiographical and fictionalizes events from her real life. The book features the protagonist character Suzanne Vale that first appeared in Postcards from the Edge. The book fictionalizes the author's relationship with Bryan Lourd, the father of her daughter Billie Lourd.

The Best Awful There Is was later published with the shorter title The Best Awful and is now largely known by this title.

Plot summary
Suzanne Vale, an actress with bipolar disorder, married Leland Franklin, a studio executive who helped her find her "far-flung best self." He then left her for a man, when their daughter, Honey, was three.

Three years later, Vale is a successful TV talk show host with a six-year-old daughter, a gay ex-husband, and an aging starlet mother. It is her love for Honey that keeps her going.

When Vale, a recovering drug addict, stops taking her medication, she is plunged into a manic episode. She goes on a search for OxyContin in Tijuana with a tattoo artist friend and a new house guest, a clinically depressed patient she met at her psycho-pharmacologist's office.

A psychotic break lands Vale at Shady Lanes, where she is the "latest loony to hit the bin." Despite her mental illness, Vale still has her wit and ability to find irony in every situation as she struggles back from the brink of insanity.

References

2004 American novels
American autobiographical novels
Novels about bipolar disorder
Novels by Carrie Fisher
Simon & Schuster books
Sequel novels